Bless is the third and final studio album by Swedish girl band Bubbles. The song "T.K.O. (Knock You Out)" was entered into the Melodifestivalen 2003. Only Caroline, Patricia and Sandra were able to sing though due to Hannah and Yenny not meeting the minimum age requirements.

Track listing
T.K.O. (Knock You Out) (The Knocked-Out Remix)
In the Name of Love
A Little Bit of This
Do You Wanna Dance
Don't Stop
Hit the Floor
Free
Can't Take My Eyes Off You
Teenager Loving
Here We Come
Roll Me Over
T.K.O. (Knock You Out) (Radio Version)
(Baby Baby) Where Did Our Love Go
In the Name of Love (Karaoke Version)
Do You Wanna Dance (Karaoke Version)
A Little Bit of This (Karaoke Version)

Personnel
Sandra Joxelius – lead vocalist
Caroline Ljungström - lead vocalist
Patricia Joxelius - lead vocalist
Hannah Steffenburg - minor vocalist
Jenny Andersén (Yenny) – minor vocalist

Charts

References

2003 albums
Bubbles (band) albums